Qvarqvare IV Jaqeli (1554 – 1581) was a Georgian Prince and Atabeg of Samtskhe-Saatabago, ruling nominally in 1573–1581. He was member of the Jaqeli family and the son of Kaikhosro II Jaqeli. During his nominal reign Meskhetian lords revolted several times against Jaqelian rule. Uprisings were suppressed by Ottomans. In 1578 Ottomans started new war against Safavid Persia for the hole territory of Caucasus. Lala Mustafa Pasha invaded Georgia. Qvarqvare IV obeyed him. Pasha had decided to send Qvarqvare and his younger brother Manuchar to Constantinople for recognizing Ottoman absolute rule in Samtskhe. Qvarqvare left the government to his mother, Dedisimedi and went to the capital of the Ottoman Empire. In 1579  by the order of Sultan Murad III Ottomans divided Samtskhe-Saatabago into eight Sanjaks and established Childir Eyalet on the lands of Meskheti. Qvarqvare IV was appointed as Christian ruler of Childir Eyalet, but his brother Manuchar converted to Islam under the name of Mustafa and became the Ottoman Pasha. Qvarqvare died childless in 1581 and was succeeded by his Muslim brother Manuchar II.

References

Sources
 
 

Atabegs of Samtskhe
Nobility of Georgia (country)
16th-century people from Georgia (country)
Ottoman governors of Georgia
Georgians from the Ottoman Empire
1554 births
1581 deaths
House of Jaqeli